Waeng Yai is a district (amphoe) of Khon Kaen province, northeastern Thailand.

Geography
Neighboring districts are (from the north clockwise): Khok Pho Chai, Chonnabot, Phon, and Waeng Noi of Khon Kaen Province; Khon Sawan of Chaiyaphum province.

History
The minor district (king amphoe) Waeng Yai was established on 3 January 1977, when the three tambons Khon Chim, Non Thong, and Mai Na Phiang were split off from Phon district. It was upgraded to a full district on 26 May 1980.

Administration
The district is divided into five subdistricts (tambons), which are further subdivided into 50 villages (mubans). Waeng Yai is a township (thesaban tambon) which covers tambon Wang Yai. There are a further four tambon administrative organizations (TAO).

References

External links
http://www.waengyaidoc.com (Thai)
amphoe.com

Waeng Yai